ï

Avantivarman was a Chamar king who founded the Utpala dynasty. He ruled Kashmir from 855 to 883 CE and built the Avantiswami Temple in Awantipora, Pulwama.

History 

AVantivarman belonged to Utpala dynasty emerged as a powerful King. He was most sagacious king. He built temples at Avantipur after his name. His Minister Suyya was a great genius. His court had a pride on two poets-Ranakar and Ananvardhana. During his time price of paddy showed a deep decline from 36 to 20 dinars. Suyya who was a great engineer is said to have drained a large chunck of wasteland during his regime. His memory is commemorated by Suyyapur or Sopore, a township in Baramulla district. It is said that when this great engineer was working in Sopore no people were coming forth to plunge themselves in gushing water. The king thereupon ordered that a part of treasury may be thrown into the water, a large number of people plunged into the river to get as many coins as they could. The skill of Suyya worked and the river was cleared of silt.

Sopore town in Baramulla district of Jammu and Kashmir was founded by the famous Utpala engineer and irrigation minister Suyya during the peaceful reign of king Avantivarman in 880 CE.

Reign
Avantivarman was the grandson of Utpala, one of the five brothers who had taken control of the Karkota throne. Raised by Utpala's minister Sura, Anantivarman ascended the throne of Kashmir on 855 CE, establishing the Utpala dynasty and ending the rule of the Karkotas. Avantivarman appointed Suyya, an engineer and architect as his prime minister. The country had been badly affected due to the numerous civil wars over the last forty years and Avantivarman's reign restored the economy. Suyya carried out desilting of the Jhelum river and diverted its course.

Arts and architecture
Avantivarman was a patron of the arts and the most notable scholar of his time was Anandhavardana, the author of the Dhvanyaloka. He founded the cities of Avantipur and Suyapur, which was named after Suyya. He built many Hindu temples dedicated to both Vishnu and Shiva as well as Buddhist monasteries. Notable among the temples were the temples of Avantiswara and Avantiswami dedicated to Shiva and Vishnu respectively in Avantipur. The reign of avantiverman witnessed a remarkable revival of Sanskrit learning in Kashmir.He built a dam on vitasta river to save kingdom from devastating flood.

Notable books written during Avantivarman's reign include Haraviyaja written by Ratnakara and Dhvanyaloka written by Anandavardhana.

Death and succession
Avantivarman died in 883 CE and his death was followed by another civil war among his descendants. The throne was finally captured by Sankaravarman in 885 CE, who ruled till 902 CE.

Coins of Avantivarman

References

Hindu monarchs
Utpala dynasty
Kashmir